In teratology, a proboscis is a blind-ended, tube-like structure, commonly located in the middle of the face. It is commonly seen in severe forms of holoprosencephaly that include cyclopia and is usually the result of abnormal development of the nose.

Types 
Proboscis formation is classified in four general types: holoprosencephalic proboscis, lateral nasal proboscis, supernumerary probosci, and disruptive proboscis.

Holoprosencephalic proboscis 
A holoprosencephalic proboscis is found in holoprosencephaly (a condition in which the forebrain of the embryo fails to develop into two hemispheres as it should). In cyclopia or ethmocephaly, proboscis is an abnormally formed nose. In cyclopia, a single eye in the middle of the face is associated with arrhinia (absence of the nose) and usually with proboscis formation above the eye. In ethmocephaly, two separate hypoteloric eyes (eyes placed very close together) are associated with arrhinia and proboscis formation above the eye. In cebocephaly, no proboscis formation occurs, but a single-nostril nose is present.

Lateral proboscis 
A lateral proboscis, also known as proboscis lateralis or lateral nasal proboscis, is a tubular proboscis-like structure and represents incomplete formation of one side of the nose; it is found instead of a nostril. The olfactory bulb is usually rudimentary on the side involved in the malformation. The tear duct, nasal bone, nasal cavity, vomer (the small thin bone separating the left and right nasal passages), maxillary sinus, ethmoidal sinuses, and another nasal structure known as the cribriform plate cells are often missing on this side as well. Ocular hypertelorism (eyes set far apart) may be present. The proboscis lateralis is a rare nasal anomaly.

Supernumerary proboscis 
A supernumerary proboscis, or accessory proboscis, is found when both nostrils are formed and there is a proboscis in addition to it. Accessory proboscis arise from a supernumerary olfactory placode.

Disruptive proboscis 
A disruptive proboscis occurs if an hamartoneoplastic lesion (benign growths such as are found in disorders like neofibromatosis and tubular sclerosis) arises in the prosencephalon (forebrain) of the embryo in its early stages of development.

References 
 John M. Guerrero, Martin S. Cogen, David R. Kelly, Brian J. Wiatrak. Proboscis Lateralis. Arch Ophthalmol. 2001;119(7):1071-1074. 
 I Kjaer, JW Keeling. The midline craniofacial skeleton in holoprosencephalic fetuses. Journal of medical genetics, 1991 
 S Acarturk, K Kivanc, E Atilla. Proboscis lateralis: evaluation of the anomaly and a review of two cases. Plastic and Reconstructive Surgery, June 2006 
 UH Vyas, SC Raibagkar, HJ Vora. Proboscis lateralis-A 17 years follow up, a case report. Indian J Plastic Surg January–June 2003 Vol 36 Issue 1 

Congenital disorders